Rafsanjan (also Romanized as Rafsanjān and Rafsinjān; also known as Bahrāmābād) is a city and capital of Rafsanjan County, Kerman Province, Iran.  At the 2006 census, its population was 136,388, in 33,489 families. Rafsanjan is the biggest producer of pistachios in the world. Also one of the biggest copper mines in the world is located there too. In addition the biggest and oldest house of the world is located there. Many famous people were born in Rafsanjan: Mirza Reza Kermani, Ali Akbar Hashemi, Adel Ferdosipour etc.

It is Iran's center of pistachio cultivation. It had an estimated population of 134,848 in 2005.

Rafsanjan is also a major center of carpet production even though the rugs are sold as Kermani rugs rather than Rafsanjani ones. Another large employer is the nearby Sarcheshmeh copper mines.

Geography
Rafsanjan is located in south part of the Lut desert, in north-west of Kerman province. The longitude of this city is 56 degrees east and the latitude is 30 degrees south. The city has an airport and railway (Tehran-Bandar Abbas route). North part of Rafsanjan has a common frontier with Bafgh and Zarand; south part is neighboring with Bardsir and on west side with Anar and Shahre-Babak; finally east side of this beautiful city is neighboring with Kerman and Zarand. Rafsanjan has two seasonal rivers named as Shour and Giouderi. The mountains in the area are part of Zagros range, and Sarcheshmeh and Davaran are the most famous.

Climate
Rafsanjan has cold and freezing winters as well as hot and dried summers. This city is located in the central part of Iran and this region is desert. The weather is hot in summer and cold in winter, days are warm and nights are cold in general. The average amount of rainfall is  annually.

Environment 
Rafsanjan has been exposed to the polluting smoke of Sarcheshme, Khatunabad and Shahrbabak copper smelters. On the other hand, up to 14 pistachio orchards are sprayed every year, as a result, dozens of tons of poison are released in the pistachio orchards of Rafsanjan. The level of arsenic contamination in Rafsanjan water is about ten times the permissible limit, and it is strongly recommended to use authorized water purification devices for drinking water, and to ensure the health of the water purification device, the water produced by the device should also be tested.

Flora and fauna
Wild plantations and trees include common fig and almonds. Wild animals which are living in mountainous areas are goats, ewes, gazelles, wolves, hyenas, wildcats and some species of birds like pigeons, eagles and partridges.

History

About the origin and creation of this city there are a lot of stories. At the period of Qajar kingdom and on Naser-Aldin-Shah (the king of Iran), Rafsanjan was named az “Anas” and was part of Fars province; after a while it came under the control of Kerman’s government. In the history, Rafsanjan has been named as a significant city due to being on the crossroad between Kerman and Yazd. At the end of Safavieh kingdom, Afghans attacked this city and caused disaster and catastrophe. The low rate of prosperity after mentioned attack was stretched until Qajar’s kingdom and the city was almost ruined until that time. At 1787 Agha Mohammad Khan Qajar attacked to Rafanjan and people decided to acquiesce in order to end the war, so he left the city without killing and death and violence. At 1866 Ebrahim Khan Zahiradole (the
government of Kerman) ordered to reshape and rebuild the city. Buildings start to construct and the situation started to improve. At 1913 Amir Mofkhem Bakhtiari ordered to build a strong wall around the city which part of ruins still remain today. This step caused importance and accredit to the city. For the first time at 1938, crossroad was built at the city, which is named as Emem Khomeyni, Enghelsb and Shohada these days. Rafsanjan was also an important city because of being one of the biggest producers of cotton earlier on time. Due to high quality of this product, it was exported to India and Russia. At 1945 Rafsanjan changed to
township. These days Rafsanjan is one of the most important and crowded cities of Kerman and has an undeniable role in the economy of state and country. Mines and pistachios are well known not only in Iran, but all around the world.

Transport 
Rafsanjan is located in the main road of Kerman-Yazd. The distances between Rafsanjan and other cities are:
Local people use both public and private vehicles, however private ones are more popular among citizens than public vehicles.
Rafsanjan also has buses, railways and an airport to go to other cities and provinces.

Population
The average population of Rafsanjan in different years have been as following:
in 2006: 139,219;
in 2011: 151,420;
in 2016: 161,909.

Notable Rafsanjanis
Former President of Iran Hashemi Rafsanjani was born in Nough, near Rafsanjan
Former Minister of Culture and Islamic Guidance, Mohammad Hosseini was born in Koshkouyeh near Rafsanjan
Seyyed Hossein Marashi, former Iranian Vice-President of Cultural Heritage and Tourism, was born in Koshkouyeh near Rafsanjan. 
Ali Samereh, Iranian football player
Mark Amin, vice president of Lions Gate Entertainment production company.

Colleges and universities
Islamic Azad University Rafsanjan Branch
Allameh Jafari University
Rafsanjan University of Medical Sciences 
Rafsanjan University of Vali Asr
Rafsanjan School of Medicine

Sport
Football club Mes Rafsanjan F.C. is based in the city.

References

Populated places in Rafsanjan County
Cities in Kerman Province